"Summer Time Love" is M-Flo's 21st single under their Rhythm Zone label. Released on June 28, 2006; it made its debut presence at a #12 spot on the weekly Japanese Oricon charts selling 13,057 copies. It features Emi Hinouchi and Ryohei.

Tracks
Summer Time Love
Summer Time Love (Lanikai Mix)
Summer Time Love (Instrumental)

2006 singles
M-Flo songs
Songs written by Verbal (rapper)
Songs written by Taku Takahashi